Doctors Point is a rural locality in the local government area (LGA) of Central Highlands in the Central LGA region of Tasmania. The 2016 census recorded a population of 5 for the state suburb of Doctors Point.

History 
Doctors Point is a confirmed locality.

Geography
The waters of Great Lake form most of the southern and eastern boundaries.

Road infrastructure 
Route A5 (Highland Lakes Road) runs through from north-east to south.

References

Towns in Tasmania
Localities of Central Highlands Council